Blaze is a 1989 American comedy-drama film written and directed by Ron Shelton. Based on the 1974 memoir Blaze Starr: My Life as Told to Huey Perry by Blaze Starr and Huey Perry, the film stars Paul Newman as Earl Long and Lolita Davidovich as Blaze Starr, with Starr herself making a cameo appearance.

At the 62nd Academy Awards in 1990, the film then received a nomination for Best Cinematography for Haskell Wexler. However, the award went to Freddie Francis for Glory. This was Wexler's fifth and final nomination, having won previously for Who's Afraid of Virginia Woolf? (1966) and Bound for Glory (1976).

Plot

The film tells the highly fictionalized story of the latter years of Earl Long, a flamboyant Governor of Louisiana, brother of assassinated governor and U.S. Senator Huey P. Long and uncle of longtime U.S. Senator Russell Long. According to the memoir and film, Earl Long allegedly fell in love with a young stripper named Blaze Starr.

Cast
 Paul Newman as Governor Earl Long
 Lolita Davidovich as Blaze Starr
 Jerry Hardin as Thibodeaux
 Gailard Sartain as LaGrange
 Jeffrey DeMunn as Eldon Tuck
 Richard Jenkins as Picayune
 Brandon Smith as Arvin Deeter
 Robert Wuhl as Red Snyder
 James Harper as Willie Rainach
 Rod Masterson as Alexandria Daily Town Talk Reporter

Reception
The film received mixed reviews from critics.  Audiences surveyed by CinemaScore gave the film a grade "B+" on scale of A to F.

Box office
Blaze debuted at number 9 at the North American box office on its opening weekend.

References

External links
 
 
 

1989 films
1980s romantic comedy-drama films
American political drama films
American romantic comedy-drama films
Films directed by Ron Shelton
Touchstone Pictures films
Films set in the 1950s
Films shot in Louisiana
A&M Films films
Films about striptease
1989 comedy films
1989 crime drama films
1980s English-language films
1980s American films